War in History (Krieg in der Geschichte, KRiG) is a German non-fiction book series established in 1999. Published by Verlag Ferdinand Schöningh, it focuses on the latest research in military history.

Concept 
The War in History series includes collections of essays or individual monographs, mostly in German (occasionally in English). Many of the works have been written as dissertations at German universities or research facilities, such as the Center for Military History and Social Sciences of the Bundeswehr. The publication in the series often explore the relationship between war and peace, as well as military and political means. For the editors of this series, investigations into the history of war cannot be carried out solely by "military considerations". Rather, historiographical diversity between foreign and domestic politics as well as society, economy and technology should be taken into account.

Selected publications 
 Rüdiger Overmans (Ed.): In der Hand des Feindes. Kriegsgefangenschaft von der Antike bis zum Zweiten Weltkrieg. Böhlau, Köln u.a. 1999, .
 Thomas Kühne, Benjamin Ziemann (Eds): Was ist Militärgeschichte? (Krieg in der Geschichte, Band 6). Schöningh, Paderborn u.a. 2000, .
 Karen Hagemann, Stefanie Schüler-Springorum (Eds): Heimat – Front. Militär- und Geschlechterverhältnisse im Zeitalter der Weltkriege (Reihe Geschichte und Geschlechter, Band 35). Campus, Frankfurt am Main u.a. 2001, .
Funktion und Gestalt militärischer Fremdherrschaft von der Antike bis zum 20. Jahrhundert (Krieg in der Geschichte, Band 28). Schöningh, Paderborn 2006, .
 Sönke Neitzel,  (Eds): Kriegsgreuel. Die Entgrenzung der Gewalt in kriegerischen Konflikten vom Mittelalter bis ins 20. Jahrhundert (Krieg in der Geschichte, Band 40). Schöningh, Paderborn 2008, .
 Markus Pöhlmann, Ulrike Ludwig,  (Eds): Ehre und Pflichterfüllung als Codes militärischer Tugenden (Krieg in der Geschichte, Volume 69). Schöningh, Paderborn 2014, .
 Kerstin von Lingen, Klaus Gestwa (Eds): Zwangsarbeit als Kriegsressource in Europa und Asien (Krieg in der Geschichte, Volume 77). Schöningh, Paderborn u.a. 2014, .
 Jens Westemeier: Himmlers Krieger. Joachim Peiper und die Waffen-SS in Krieg und Nachkriegszeit (Krieg in der Geschichte, Volume 71). 2014, .

References

External links 
 
 Krieg in der Geschichte  on the Verlag Ferdinand Schöningh web site

Historiography